Sampson Jackson II (born January 30, 1953) was a Democratic member of the Mississippi Senate who represented the 32nd District from 1992 until his resignation in 2021. He was succeeded by Rod Hickman following a 2021 special election.

References

External links
Mississippi State Senate – Sampson Jackson II official government website
Project Vote Smart – Senator Sampson Jackson II (MS) profile
Follow the Money – Sampson Jackson II
20072003 1999 campaign contributions

African-American state legislators in Mississippi
Democratic Party Mississippi state senators
1953 births
Living people
People from Kemper County, Mississippi
21st-century American politicians
People from De Kalb, Mississippi
21st-century African-American politicians
20th-century African-American people